The fourth HMS Rupert (K561) was a British Captain-class frigate of the Royal Navy in commission during World War II. Originally constructed as a United States Navy Buckley class destroyer escort, she served in the Royal Navy from 1943 to 1946.

Construction and transfer
The ship was laid down as the unnamed U.S. Navy destroyer escort DE-96 by Bethlehem-Hingham Shipyard, Inc., in Hingham, Massachusetts, on 25 August 1943 and launched on 31 October 1943. She was transferred to the United Kingdom upon completion on 24 December 1943.

Service history

Commissioned into service in the Royal Navy  as the frigate HMS Rupert (K561) on 24 December 1943 simultaneously with her transfer, the ship served on patrol and escort duty. On 30 March 1945, she joined the British frigate  in a depth charge attack which sank the German submarine U-965 north of Scotland in position .

On 27 April 1945, the German submarine U-1105 detected three British frigates in the North Atlantic Ocean 25 nautical miles (46 km) west of County Mayo, Ireland, and fired two G7es – known to the Allies as "GNAT" – torpedoes at them. U-1105 evaded counterattack. Rupert stood by Redmill and rendered assistance, and Redmill managed to remain afloat and was towed to Lisahally, Northern Ireland.

The Royal Navy returned Rupert to the U.S. Navy on 20 March 1946.

Disposal
The U.S. Navy struck Rupert from its Naval Vessel Register on 17 April 1946. She was sold on 17 June 1946 for scrapping.

References
Navsource Online: Destroyer Escort Photo Archive Rupert (DE-96) HMS Rupert (K-561)
uboat.net HMS Rupert (K 561)
Destroyer Escort Sailors Association DEs for UK
Captain Class Frigate Association: HMS Rupert K561 (DE 96)

External links
Photo gallery of HMS Rupert (K561)

 

Captain-class frigates
Buckley-class destroyer escorts
World War II frigates of the United Kingdom
Ships built in Hingham, Massachusetts
1943 ships